Darragon is a French surname. Notable people with the surname include:

Frederique Darragon (born 1949), French explorer
Louis Darragon (1883–1918), French cyclist
Roddy Darragon (born 1983), French cross-country skier and non-commissioned officer

French-language surnames